The Pierce-Arrow Motor Car Company was an American motor vehicle manufacturer based in Buffalo, New York, which was active from 1901 to 1938. Although best known for its expensive luxury cars, Pierce-Arrow also manufactured commercial trucks, fire trucks, boats, camp trailers, motorcycles, and bicycles.

Origin
The forerunner of Pierce-Arrow was established in 1865 as Heinz, Pierce and Munschauer. The company was best known for its household items, especially its delicate, gilded birdcages. In 1872, George Norman Pierce bought out the other two principals of the company, changed the name to the George N. Pierce Company, and in 1896 added bicycles to the product line. The company failed in its attempt to build a steam-powered car in 1900 under license from Overman, but by 1901, had built its first single-cylinder, two-speed, no-reverse Motorette. In 1903, it produced a two-cylinder car, the Arrow.

In 1904, Pierce decided to concentrate on making a larger, more luxurious car for the upscale market, the Great Arrow. This became the company's most successful product. The solidly built, four-cylinder car won the Glidden Tour in 1905, an endurance run to determine and celebrate the most reliable car. Thirty-three cars entered the 350-mile race from New York City to Bretton Woods, New Hampshire; the race was won by Percy Pierce in a Great Arrow.

The noted industrial architect Albert Kahn designed the Pierce Arrow Factory Complex at Elmwood Avenue and Great Arrow Avenue in about 1906. It was listed on the National Register of Historic Places in 1974. George Pierce sold all rights in the company in 1907, and he died three years later. In 1908, Pierce  Motor Company was renamed as the Pierce-Arrow Motor Car Company.

In 1909, U.S. President William Howard Taft ordered two Pierce-Arrows (and two White Model M Tourers) to be used for state occasions, the first official cars of the White House.

In 1910, Pierce dropped its other 4-cylinder models and focused exclusively on 6-cylinder cars until 1929. The model 6-36, 6-48, and 6-66 continued for the next decade. Starting in 1918, Pierce-Arrow adopted a four-valve per cylinder T-head inline-six engine (Dual Valve Six) and three spark plugs per cylinder, one of the few, if only, multi-valve flathead design engines ever made. The company did not introduce an 8-cylinder engine until the 1929 Model 126, and a V-12 engine was offered in 1931 until the company closed in 1938.

In 1910, George Pierce died. In 1912, Herbert M. Dawley (later a Broadway actor-director) joined Pierce-Arrow, and he designed almost every model until 1938. Until 1914, Pierce-Arrow also made a line of motorcycles, including the Pierce Four.

In 1914, Pierce-Arrow adopted its most enduring styling hallmark when its headlights were moved from a traditional placement at the radiator's sides, into flared housings molded into the front fenders of the car. This gave the car an immediately visible distinction in front or side views. At night, the car appeared to have a wider stance. Pierce patented this placement, which endured until the final model of 1938, although Pierce always offered customers the option of conventional headlamps; only a minority ordered this option.

The Pierce-Arrow was a status symbol, owned by many Hollywood stars and tycoons, and a favorite was the Pierce-Arrow Town Car. Most of the royalty of the world had at least one Pierce-Arrow in its collection. Some have described Pierce and two of its rivals among American luxury cars, Peerless and Packard, as the "Three P's of Motordom." Industrial efficiency expert Frank Gilbreth, father of the authors of "Cheaper By The Dozen," extolled the virtues of Pierce-Arrow, in both quality and in its ability to safely transport his large family. The transmission was a four speed manual in 1919. Actor Sessue Hayakawa (famed for his role in Bridge on the River Kwai) drove a custom-ordered gold-plated Pierce-Arrow. A restored 1919 Pierce-Arrow is on display at the Woodrow Wilson Presidential Library. An open-bodied Pierce-Arrow carried Woodrow Wilson and Warren G. Harding to Harding's 1921 inauguration, and one was used prominently in the 1950 movie Cheaper by the Dozen.

Pierce-Arrow advertisements were artistic and understated. Unusual for car advertising, the image of the car was in the background rather than the foreground of the picture. Usually, only part of the car was visible. The Pierce-Arrow was typically depicted in elegant and fashionable settings. Some advertisements featured the car in places a car would not normally go, such as the West and other rural settings, a testament to the car's ruggedness and quality.

Because of the immense size of most models, several second-hand Pierce-Arrow cars were bought by fire departments, stripped down to the chassis and engine, the wheelbase lengthened, and built back into fire engines. Some of these fire engines were in service for up to 20 years.

1928–1933
In 1928, the Studebaker Corporation of South Bend, Indiana, gained control of the Buffalo firm. The association was to last for five years, with moderate benefits to both companies' engineering departments, which continued to function as separate entities. Pierce-Arrow also gained a dealer network, as the cars were sold through Studebaker dealerships. Under Studebaker's ownership, Pierce-Arrow retired the venerable 6-cylinder engine and in 1929 introduced an L-head straight-eight engine, which displaced .

1933-1938

In 1933, Pierce-Arrow unveiled the radically streamlined Silver Arrow in a final attempt to appeal to the wealthy at the New York Auto Show. The car was well received by the public and the motoring press, being announced with the slogan "Suddenly it's 1940!" Pierce sold five examples but, since it was priced at $10,000 (equal to $ today) during the worst of the Depression, even the rich were hesitant to spend so much. The bodies were built at Studebaker, which subsequently assisted in rolling out a lower-priced production model. This, however, lacked many luxury features of the show car and still failed to generate enough sales.

Starting in 1936, Pierce-Arrow produced a line of camper-trailers, the Pierce-Arrow Travelodge. They also produced a new V12 sedan that was redesigned and considered the safest and most luxurious sedan of its day.

The Rio Grande Southern Railroad converted five Pierce-Arrow automobiles (and a couple of Buicks) into motorized railcars, effectively buses and trucks on rail wheels. The nickname Galloping Goose was soon applied to these vehicles, reportedly based on their waddling motion and honking horn. Three are preserved in the Colorado Railroad Museum at Golden.

Pierce was the only luxury brand that did not field a lower-priced car (e.g., the Packard 120) to provide cash flow, and without sales or funds for development, the company declared insolvency in 1938 and closed its doors. The final Pierce-Arrow assembled was built by Karl Wise, the firm's chief engineer, from parts secured from the company's receivers. Pierce's remaining assets (which probably would include the forty Arrows made in October 1938) were sold at auction on a Friday, May 13, 1938.

The factory equipment used to make Pierce-Arrow V12 engines was bought by Seagrave Fire Apparatus, which used it to make engines for fire engines.

Name trademark
In 2006, a group of classic car enthusiasts from Switzerland applied the name to a 10 L, 24-cylinder car designed by Luigi Colani. According to their (defunct) website, the company intended to revive the Pierce-Arrow car in the form of a Pierce Silver Arrow II.

The U.S. Trademark Trial and Appeal Board ruled on August 12, 2019, that "Pierce-Arrow" cannot be registered by an unrelated third party as a trademark for the production of a new automobile.  This decision establishes a new precedent for protection of

Advertisements

List of models
There were at least 39 defined models  listed here:

Pierce Silver Arrow
Pierce-Arrow 1240A
Pierce-Arrow 1245
Pierce-Arrow 1248A
Pierce-Arrow 1255
Pierce-Arrow 1601
Pierce-Arrow 1602
Pierce-Arrow 1603
Pierce-Arrow 1701
Pierce-Arrow 1702
Pierce-Arrow 1703
Pierce-Arrow 1801
Pierce-Arrow 1802
Pierce-Arrow 1803
Pierce-Arrow 836A
Pierce-Arrow 840A
Pierce-Arrow 845
Pierce-Arrow Model 1236
Pierce-Arrow Model 1242
Pierce-Arrow Model 1247
Pierce-Arrow Model 133
Pierce-Arrow Model 143
Pierce-Arrow Model 31
Pierce-Arrow Model 32
Pierce-Arrow Model 33
Pierce-Arrow Model 36
Pierce-Arrow Model 41
Pierce-Arrow Model 42
Pierce-Arrow Model 43
Pierce-Arrow Model 51
Pierce-Arrow Model 52
Pierce-Arrow Model 53
Pierce-Arrow Model 54
Pierce-Arrow Model 80
Pierce-Arrow Model 81
Pierce-Arrow Model 836
Pierce-Arrow Model A
Pierce-Arrow Model B
Pierce-Arrow Model C

Gallery

See also
 List of automobile manufacturers
 List of defunct automobile manufacturers
 Pierce-Arrow Town Car
 Pierce-Arrow armoured AA lorry
 Pierce Silver Arrow

References

17. http://ttabvue.uspto.gov/ttabvue/ttabvue-91224343-OPP-58.pdf

Further reading
 Brierley, Brooks T. There is no mistaking a Pierce-Arrow (Garrett & Stringer, 1986).
 Siuru, William D. "Pierce-Arrow: Wheels For the Well-Heeled!" History Magazine (Apr 2010_ 11#4 pp 45–47.

External links

 The Pierce-Arrow Society
 The Pierce-Arrow Museum of Buffalo NY
 Pierce on City of Buffalo History site
 Pierce-Arrow Theater
 White Glove Collection Pierce Arrows
 Pierce: The Missing Link on MyByk
 1916 advertisement
 Pierce-Arrow cars 3D models

Luxury motor vehicle manufacturers
Defunct motor vehicle manufacturers of the United States
Defunct motorcycle manufacturers of the United States
Pierce Arrow
History of Buffalo, New York
Vehicle manufacturing companies established in 1901
Vehicle manufacturing companies disestablished in 1938
1901 establishments in New York (state)
1938 disestablishments in New York (state)
American companies disestablished in 1938
American companies established in 1901
Defunct manufacturing companies based in New York (state)
Defunct companies based in Buffalo, New York
Vintage vehicles
Brass Era vehicles
Veteran vehicles
1900s cars
1910s cars
1920s cars
1930s cars
Pre-war vehicles
Motor vehicle manufacturers based in New York (state)
Cars introduced in 1901
Luxury vehicles